The Associated Carpenters and Joiners of Scotland was a trade union representing woodworkers in Scotland.

History
The union was founded in 1861 on the initiative of the small United Joiners of Glasgow and the West of Scotland.  Initially, it had only 630 members, but it grew with branches established across Scotland, and also in England and Ireland, as members travelled to find work.  William Matson proposed that the union merge with the Amalgamated Society of Carpenters and Joiners (ASC&J) as early as 1862, but his suggestion was unpopular and was not implemented.

Membership reached 5,000 by 1873, and peaked at 9,787 in 1899.  William McIntyre, secretary during the 1890s, was strongly opposed to a merger with the ASC&J or the General Union of Carpenters and Joiners (GUC&J), but his successor, Alexander Stark, tried to arrange a merger of all three unions in order to counteract falling membership.  With membership down to just 3,964 in 1910, a successful merger with the ASC&J was finally completed the following year.

General Secretaries
1862: George Ross
1865: William Matson
1868: William Paterson
1883: James Beveridge
1892: William McIntyre
1903: Alexander Stark

References

Defunct trade unions of the United Kingdom
1861 establishments in Scotland
Carpenters' trade unions
Trade unions established in 1861
Trade unions disestablished in 1911